Waghmare is a surname. Notable people with the surname include:

Charan Waghmare, Indian politician
Janardan Waghmare (born 1934), Indian politician
Somnath Waghmare, Indian documentary filmmaker
Umesh Waghmare, Indian physicist

Indian surnames